There are several methods to create a Geotagged photograph (see also Geotagging). The application of this is to allow photo management applications to use this information to manage images.

Some of the existing methods for embedding location information to a captured image are:
 A camera that has built-in GPS;
 A camera with interface for an external GPS (the interface could be a physical connector or a bluetooth adapter to a remote GPS logger, or WiFi and an app to allow the camera to sync GPS from a smartphone);
 A storage media (CF or SD card) that has GPS or WiFi built-in (products like Eye-Fi provides cards like this, only supported for some cameras).

List of cameras

See also
 List of digital camera brands

References

External links
http://www.dpreview.com/products/search/cameras?ref=mainmenu#criterias=SpecsGPS&paramSpecsGPS=BuiltIn%2COptional

Digital cameras